Sona Spa is a 2013 Hindi drama film directed by Makarand Deshpande and produced by Madan Paliwal. The film features Naseeruddin Shah, Aahana Kumra, Shruti Vyas and Pooja Pradhan as main characters.

Cast
Naseeruddin Shah as Baba Dayanand
Aahana Kumra as Ritu
Shruti Vyasa as Rucha
Pooja Pradhan as Indira 
Nivedita Bhattacharya as Meenakshi
Akkash Basnet as sachin
Vineet Sharma as Rucha's father
Romi Jaspal as Choksi
Devyani as Shirley
Rohit Soans as Owner of Sona Spa
Aditi Girkar as Sound Effects

Soundtrack

Reception

References

External links
 

2010s Hindi-language films
2013 films